The CZW World Tag Team Championship was a professional wrestling world tag team championship owned and copyrighted by the Combat Zone Wrestling (CZW) promotion; it is contested for in their tag team division. The championship was created and debuted on February 13, 1999 at CZW's Opening Night event. Although the title is a world tag team championship, supposedly only intended for tag teams, a wrestler has held the championship by himself – Justice Pain. He held the championship on his own from November 20, 1999 to January 8, 2000, when he lost it to Diablos Macabre and Midknight, who are known as The Thrill Kill Kult, the same team he defeated to win the championship.

The inaugural champions were Jon Dahmer and Jose Rivera, Jr., who were awarded the championship on February 13, 1999 at CZW's Opening Night event. Sabian holds the record for the most individual reigns with 9. The Best Around's one reign is the longest in the title's history, at  days. At less than one day, Dahmer and Rivera, Jr.'s only reign and 2 Girls, 1 Cup (Beef Wellington and Greg Excellent)'s first reign are tied for the shortest. CMD (Desean Pratt & Boom Harden) are the current champions, winning at Limelight 14 in the Chri$ Ca$h Memorial Ladder match.

Title history

Combined reigns

By team

By wrestler

Notes
1. – Information has not been found to tell who "The Brothers of East L.A." are. CZW records state only the team name, and not the members in results and title histories. Other third party sources state the same as well.
2. – It is unknown which day of the month the championship was vacated. The reign is thus marked as ending on the first day of November 1999.
3. – Each reign is ranked highest to lowest; reigns with the exact same number mean that they are tied for that certain rank.

References
General

Specific

External links
CZWrestling.com

Combat Zone Wrestling championships
Professional wrestling tag team champion lists